Sport in Kosovo has established tradition and plays a prominent role in society. Popular sports in Kosovo include football, basketball, volleyball, handball, and rugby, whereas major individual sports include wrestling, judo, swimming, boxing, karate and skiing.

Individual sports have led to Kosovo's biggest successes. Outstanding boxers such as Aziz Salihu, Mehmet Bogujevci, Sami Buzolli, Besim Kabashi. Judokas like Majlinda Kelmendi and Nora Gjakova, Distria Krasniqi have won medals in major international competitions. Some of the federations that are part of the international associations are Kosovo Taekwondo Federation, Boxing Federation, Handball Federation, Judo Federation, and Kosovo Ski Federation. Nevertheless, athletes who were born and raised in European countries had the opportunity to be successful in the international arena.

Association football

The most popular sport in Kosovo is football. The playing of football in Kosovo is documented since at least 1914. However, only in 1922 were the two first football clubs formed, FC Gjakova and FC Prishtina. Until 1926 the clubs competed within the several levels of the Belgrade Football Subassociation, and after 1926, clubs from Kosovo were integrated into the newly formed Skopje Football Subassociation. The subassociations organised different levels of leagues which served as qualification leagues for the Yugoslav championship. From 1945 until 1991, football in the former Yugoslavia advanced so fast that in 1946 the Football Federation of Kosovo was formed as a subsidiary of the Football Federation of Yugoslavia. The most successful team from Kosovo in the first league of Yugoslavia was FC Prishtina, while KF Trepça was part of the league for one year. In 1991 the Football Federation of Kosovo was founded after all football players from Kosovo were banned from the First League in Yugoslavia. The first game was held in KF Flamurtari's stadium on 13 September 1991 in Pristina, which also marked the start of the first independent championship in Kosovo. The governing body in Kosovo is mainly responsible for the national team and for most of the main cup competitions.

Currently, Kosovo has a football league system which incorporates a number of clubs. The top division, the Raiffeisen Super League, has 12 teams. The league was founded in 1945 and is organized by the Football Federation of Kosovo. The other three professional divisions are the first league which includes 16 teams, and the second and third league. There are also semi-professional and amateur football clubs that are active as well. The main cup competition in Kosovo is the Republic of Kosovo Cup, which is open to every men's football team that is part of the Football Federation of Kosovo. The most successful clubs are FC Prishtina (twenty championship titles), KF Vëllaznimi (eight championship titles), KF Trepça (seven championship titles), KF Liria (five championship titles), and KF Besa (three championship titles).

The two main clubs in football are FC Prishtina and KF Trepça who have achieved great success in football. The football club Prishtina FC was founded in 1922, while KF Trepça was founded ten years later in 1932. KF Trepça was part of the 1977-78 championship in the former Yugoslavia League in football. One year later they reached huge success since they were able to play in the finals for the former Yugoslavia Cup against HNK Rijeka in which they lost close. FC Prishtina became the first member of the league in 1983, and it achieved victory after beating Red Star in Belgrade with 3–1. During this time Fadil Vokrri impressed all with his talent as he was part of so-called "Golden Generation" of Prishtina. They would finish their first season in the 8th place. Fc Prishtina at the same season played in the Mitropa Cup, in which they came runners up to Eisenstadt from Austria. In the following seasons Prishtina were able to compete in the league until their last season in 1988. In the 1987–88 Yugoslav Cup prishtina reached the semifinals, in which they would lose against Borac Banja Luka after penalties. The first unofficial Championship in Kosovo were held in 1991 in which 12 Clubs participated. After some years without UEFA Club European football Kosovo was finally recognized by the UEFA in 2016. FC Ballkani became the first Kosovan football Club to qualify for an UEFA Competition, as they beat KF Shkupi in the play-off round away and home to take place for the Groupstage of the 2022–23 UEFA Europa Conference League. In Group G Ballkani faced in Prishtina in the debut CFR Cluj from Romania. They draw their first ever UEFA Club competition game with 1-1 thanks to an goal from Armend Thaqi , securing Kosovos first ever points in a UEFA club competition. After an close lose to Slavia Prague away from home, Ballkani would than secure Kosovo, maiden win in a UEFA competition as they beat Turkish side Sivasspor with an entertaining 3–4 win away in turkey. Despite some good performances Ballkani couldn't progress further as they secure only four points in the process, finishing in last place. It is still Kosovo's highest European club football success, in the history of the country. Other notable Kosovan Football clubs are FC Drita from Gjilan, who won the Superleague of Kosovo three times most recently in 2019-20. In Europe their best result came at the previous saison, as they nearly overcome the well known side Feyenoord Rotterdam in two legs, losing away with 2-3 despite leading with goals from Marko Simonovski and Astrit Fazliu in the process. Kosovo strongest encounter in recent history.

Three football players born in Kosovo (Milutin Šoškić, Fahrudin Jusufi, Vladimir Durković) were part of the Yugoslavia national football team, who won the gold medal at the 1960 Summer Olympics and silver medal at the 1960 European Championship. Nowadays, in many European teams there are players from Kosovo who have the opportunity to show their talents and values. Lorik Cana was the captain of Olympique de Marseille and Sunderland A.F.C, while Valon Behrami played for West Ham United F.C. and currently is playing for Watford FC. There are other players who had the opportunity to play for European football teams, such as Xherdan Shaqiri, who plays as a midfielder for Liverpool and for the Switzerland national football team.

The Kosovo Football Federation is preparing to play against North Macedonia in order to hopefully qualify for the Euro 2020s. The Kosovo Football Federation enjoyed an unbeaten streak in international football from 2017 before succumbing to defeat against England with the respectable score of 5–3 to England, Kosovo opened the score with a very early goal from Berisha.

In May 2016, Kosovo became the 55th member of UEFA and the 210th member of FIFA.

Kosovo Derby 
 
 	
Kosovo Derby is the largest football derby in Kosovo which is contested between fierce rivals Drita FC and SC Gjilani. The derby was started in 1995 after the crisis and split of Drita FC. For the past 20 years the match has attracted tens of thousands of fans.

Futsal  
Kosovo's history in Futsal is stated since the early 21th century. They finally got accepted as an UEFA futsal member on the Congress in Budapest on September 2015. They are accepted as an World Futsal member in the 66th FIFA congress held in Mexico, being finally fully accepted on May 2016.  The Futsal Superleague of Kosovo was founded in 2005. 

They gain access to the UEFA Futsal Champions League in their debut saison in the 2016–17 UEFA Futsal Cup. In which FC Feniks Drenas made their debut for Kosovo at this competition.  Feniks were able to impress in the first round as they won all three matches against Oxford City Lions with 2-3 from England, they beating than Andorran side FC Encamp with an high scoring 0-12 win against the host of this round. In the third and final match Feniks Drenica were once more able to win as they beat ASA Tel Aviv with an final score of 6-0 respectively. Qualifying as an debutant to the Main round. In the Main Round they were able to maintain their form. They won their first match against the host Železarec Skopje with 0-5 respectively. That would be followed by an close lose to  the aserbaidschan side Araz Naxçivan with 0-1 despite that loss. Feniks than were able to beat Tbilisi State University from Georgia with an decisive 3-7 win to qualify as the first Kosovan Futsal Club to qualify for the Elite Round , competing with the sixteen best European clubs that year. It is so far also the best result for Kosovo in a Football based competition.

Basketball
Basketball is one of the most known sports in Kosovo. The first championship was held in 1991 with the participation of eight teams. The first champion was KB Prishtina. The Basketball Federation of Kosovo was accepted as a full member of FIBA on 13 March 2015. Kosovo took first part in the EuroBasket qualification for the first time in 2017. Kosovo would secure their first ever win against North Macedonia in their debut winning with 72–68 at home. Kosovo would win once more during the Pre-Qualifiers, against Estonia 75–69 to finish with a (2–2) record to advance to the first round of World Cup qualifying. In the next round, Kosovo would eventually see their World Cup hopes vanish, as the team went winless before being eliminated. Notable players born in Kosovo who played for the very successful Yugoslavia national basketball team including Zufer Avdija, Marko Simonović, and Dejan Musli.

Since 2013, two teams from Kosovo KB Prishtina and KB Peja have participated in the Balkan International Basketball League (BIBL).
Te Kosovo Basketball Federation organizes competitions in different categories for men and women. The major league of basketball is called ETC Super League following, first league, juniors' league, cadets' league, and pioneers' league.
Also part of the Kosovo Basketball Federation competitions is the Cup of Kosovo. The current winner is Peja.
Participating teams in the ETC Super League are: KB Prishtina, Peja, Trepça, Bashkimi, Drita, Besa, RTV 21, and Kastrioti.
The current champion is Sigal Prishtina.

KB Prishtina is the most successful Basketball team in Kosovo. They being crowned champions of the Kosovo Basketball Superleague 14 times. They also won the Kosovo Cup 15 times most recently in 2020. KB Prishtina also won the Kosovo Supercup seven times so far. KB Prishtina successfully won twice the Balkan International Basketball League first in 2014-15 against BC Rilski Sportist and for the second time in 2015-16 after beating in the finals Mornar Bar. Prishtina made their debut in European Basketball at the FIBA Europe Cup in 2015-16. They were able to qualify for the Play-offs for the first time in 2018-19 where they faced in the round of sixteen Pallacanestro Varese. It is the best result for Kosovan basketball at the FIBA Europe Cup. So far Kosovan Basketball club's won 17 matches in European Basketball. KB Ylli is the most recent club who represented Kosovo at the 2022–23 FIBA Europe Cup. Their most famous win came against the German side Brose Bamberg winning away from home with 78-81 after over time.

One of the most famous clubs in basketball was called Elektricisti, part of the second division in the former Yugoslavia, while Zufer Avdija, a basketball player for Eleketricisti has played for the basketball national team of Yugoslavia when they were part of the European Basketball League.

The female Basketball club  Univerziteti Prishtina have a long history as competing in the 1970 and 80's in the Yugoslav Women's Basketball League. Were they competed between the first and second division in Yugoslavia.They participated with success at the WABA League in 2003-04, in which they qualified for the Final Four after finishing third in the Regular season. They faced in the semifinals Croatian side Šibenik Jolly JBS. In which they lost with 81–64 in the end missing out on the finals. In the third place match they faced another Croatian team in Croatia 2006 Prishtina lost this match close on the third place, finishing, this tournament in 4th place. Still one of the greatest achievements for the female Basketball club in Kosovo.

Judo
Judo is a martial art that brought Kosovo its first gold medal. The organization of games between the clubs is controlled by the Judo Federation of Kosovo. The Kosovo Judo Federation was accepted in 2012 as a full member of the International Judo Federation. Presently, there are 12 clubs active from different cities in Kosovo. The number of participants from all the clubs is 750 men and 250 women, while the number of active coaches is 25.

Judo is the most successful individual sport in Kosovo. At the European Judo Championships the Kosovan judokas winning so far 22 medals in which of them being 8 gold 3 silver and 11 bronze, since their first participation in 2014. In the World Judo Championships they would win one gold medal in 2013 and 5 times Bronze as well. Kosovo also secured medals in Judo at the Mediterranean Games they won nine medals in which 6 are gold, 1 silber and 2 are bronze since their debut in 2018 Tarragona.

The most successful judoka is Driton Kuka, who was a champion for many years. He won the bronze medal at the European Championship in 1990, and the World Cup in Hungary in 1991. Nowadays, Kuka is the coach of Majlinda Kelmendi, a former judoka from Pejë who represented Kosovo in all judo competitions. Kelmendi won the gold medal at the 2009 World Junior Championships in Paris, France. She finished the fifth in the 2010 World Junior Championships in Morocco, and ninth in the 52 category at the 2010 World Judo Championships in Tokyo, Japan. However, she was not allowed to represent Kosovo at the 2012 Summer Olympics in London due to the resistance of the International Olympic Committee and the United Nations. Kelmendi gave Kosovo its first judo world title on 27 August 2013, as she beat Erika Miranda, a Brazilian judoka in the 52-kilogram gold medal match in Rio de Janeiro. In 2013, she was ranked first in the international rankings by the International Judo Federation in the 52 kg category. Majlinda Kelmendi would defend her title again at the 2014 World Judo Championships – Women's 52 kg in which she won gold at the finals. In her same year she became also a European Judo Champion in Montpellier, France, after beating in the finals Russian Natalia Kuziutina. Her next Triumph prior to the Summer Olympics came at the 2016 European Judo Championships in Russia defeating in the Women's 52 kg Gold medal match, French judoka Priscilla Gneto, winning her second gold medal at the European Judo Championships for Kosovo. She than would go on to win Kosovo's first ever Olympic medal at the 2016 Summer Olympics in the Women's 52 kg category after beating in a close final Odette Giuffrida, to secure her first ever gold medal for her country at this competition. Kelmendi than go on to win gold for the third time at the 2017 European Judo Championships in Warsaw in Poland. It is followed by her fourth and final gold medal win at the 2019 European Games after winning the finals against Natalia Kuziutina to secure Kosovo first ever gold medal at the European Games in their history. She competed for her second time and final time at the 2020 Summer Olympics. In which her injury let her down as she lost in the second round to Hungarian Réka Pupp. After that she retired her Judo Carrier by winning four European Judo Championships, two World Judo Championships and one Judo Olympic Gold medal for her country. She is nowadays working as an Judo coach for Kosovo under Driton Kuka.

Nora Gjakova won the first medal for Kosovo at the European Games when she earned bronze in the 57 kg category. At the following 2019 European Games Majlinda Kelmendi won gold in the 57 kg category. Nora Gjakova won silver and Loriana Kuka won the bronze medal in Judo as well. In total Kosovo won four medals at the European Games.

Kosovo competed with success at the Summer Olympics in Judo.
Majlinda Kelmendi would win Gold in Judo at the 2016 Summer Olympics – Women's 52 kg. The first Olympic medal for Kosovo in their history.  
Distria Krasniqi win the first golden medal for Kosovo in Judo at the 2020 Summer Olympics – Women's 48 kg. Nora Gjakova won the second gold medal at the 2020 Summer Olympics for Kosovo in Judo at the 2020 Summer Olympics – Women's 57 kg. The third golden medal in Kosovo's Olympic history. Kosovo would finish the 2020 Summer Olympics at the 42 place in the end.

Boxing 
Boxing is one of the most popular sports in Kosovo. Many Kosovan boxers competed with success, in the past for Yugoslavia and for other nations in fact such as Luan Krasniqi being the 1996 European Boxing Champion and Olympic Bronze medalist for Germany, or Arnold Gjergjaj. Nowadays Ilir Latifi compete in UFC for Sweden. Robin Krasniqi who is born in Istog in Kosovo, competing for Germany in Boxing. He held the IBO light-heavyweight and  WBA interim light-heavyweight championship.

Aziz Salihu is the most successful Boxer in Kosovo. He won eight Yugoslav championships in which of them five consecutive. Aziz would win two bronze medals at the European Championships first in  1981 Tampere and 1985 in Budapest. He won at the 1984 Summer Olympics the bronze medal in Super heavyweight. He competed at the Boxing World Cup held in   1987 Belgrade and won the bronze medal in Super heavyweight. Aziz would win Gold in Boxing at the 1987 Mediterranean Games held in Syria. Aziz Salihu became the first Kosovan to compete for the third time for Yugoslavia in Boxing at the 1988 Summer Olympics in Seoul, South Korea.

Sami Buzoli is a boxer who boxed for Prishtina. He competed for Yugoslavia for the first time, at the European Championships in 1981. He reached the finals in the Bantamweight category, in which he lost against Viktor Miroshnichenko. He would repeat his feet at the following  European Championships in 1983 Varna, when he won silver for the second time, in his boxing career. The year before he competed at the  World Boxing Championship in 1982 Munich, in which he would win Bronze in the Bantamweight category as well.

Mehmet Bogujevci is a well known Boxer in Kosovo and Yugoslavia. He won five boxing Championships for Prishtina in Yugoslavia. At the European Championships in 1977 Halle he would win Bronze in light welterweight. He would compete at the World Boxing Championship in 1978 Belgrad in which he would win silber in light welterweight. One year later he would win Gold in boxing at the Mediterranean Games in 1979 Split. Mehmet Bogujevci became the first individual athlete from Kosovo to compete for Yugoslavia at the Olympics at the 1980 Summer Olympics in the men's welterweight category, reaching the quarterfinals, in his sole participation at the Summer Olympics for Yugoslavia.

Besim Kabashi is a known Kickboxer in Kosovo and Germany. He boxed between 1997 and 2002 in the Light Heavyweight and Super Heavyweight division, winning in his debut year the WKA German Light Heavyweight Titel. He would returned once more to the ring four years later in 2006. He had immediately success, as he beat Zoran Dorcic in the second round to become the WKA European Super Heavyweight Champion in 2007. Besim would then beat Yahya Gülay in the fourth round to become WKA World Heavyweight in 2008 he would defend his Titel three more years, before his death in 2011. In his total carrier he lost only one fight out of his 66 fights winning 65 fights during his time.

Donjeta Sadiku is a well known female boxer from Prishtina. Donjeta made her debut for Kosovo at the 2020 Summer Olympics in Tokio in the Women's lightweight discipline. Being the first Boxer from Kosovo to represent her country. Sadiku 
won the bronze medal at the 2022 IBA Women's World Boxing Championships in Istanbul. She won the first medal for Kosovo in the Boxing World Championship. She would follow her medal drain after winning again the bronze medal at the Women's European Boxing Championships in 2022 Budva. The first medal for Kosovo after 35 Years in this competition.

Handball
The first big handball teams were formed during 1948, including Milicionar (Milicionari), Jedinstvo Đakovica (Jedinstvo e Gjakovës), Budućnost Peć (Buduçnosti i Pejës), Trepča Mitrovica (Trepça e Mitrovicës), Kosovo (Kosova), and Priština (Prishtinës). Small handball (modern handball) was introduced in 1950–1951. Handball teams succeeded in joining the first and second leagues in the former Yugoslavia, which at that time (1970–1980) was among the strongest leagues in the world.

From 13 to 23 October 1979, the women's World Junior Championships, Kosova '79, were held in Kosovo. The participants were: Austria, USSR, Denmark, France, the Netherlands, Hungary, Italy, Japan, Yugoslavia, Norway, DR Germany, FR Germany and United States.

Teams such as Borci, Prishtina and Trepca reached the first league of the former Yugoslavia. Some of the players that played for the Yugoslav national team were Aziz Makiqi, Hasan Bajrami, and Tahir Sojeva.

The greatest success so far was achieved in the Cell Cup tournament in Hungary in 2013, where the Kosovo U18 team took second place in a competition with teams from across Europe. Kosovo would host the 2019 IHF Inter-Continental Trophy in Prishtina. In which the Kosovo U21 men's handball national were able to win this competition after beating Chinese Taipei in the finals with 30–26, to qualify for the first time ever to the IHF Men's Junior World Championship in 2019 Spain. They became the first national team in Kosovo to qualify for a world championship, in any team sports.

After the Kosovo War, many attempts were made for the internationalization of handball however this did not happen until December 18, 2004, when Kosovo handball federation was accepted in the European handball federation with conditional rights. After that year, Kosovo's teams such as KH Prishtina, KH Besa Famiglia and KH Kastrioti participated in European competitions.

Nowadays in Kosovo there is a handball super league (major league), cup of Kosovo, first league, juniors' league, and cadets' league in both the women's and men's categories. Another part of Kosovo Handball Federation is beach handball. Participating clubs in the super league are: Besa Famiglia, Prishtina, Kosova, Kastrioti, Zhegra, Drenica, Vëllaznimi, Trepça, Samadrexha, Llapi, and Drita. The 2014 champion was KH Prishtina.

The Kosovo men's national handball team is a recognized member since 2014 in the EHF and IHF.
After a short time Kosovo would hold its first Handball Tournament the 2015 IHF Emerging Nations Championship was held in Prishtina. They impressively would win the bronze medal in their debut participation. Defeating Uruguay for third place with an result of 28–16, the first medal in their young Handball history. Kosovo would follow the same achievement in the following Tournament winning bronze again in Bulgaria 2017 beating Cyprus with 32–25 in the end. Securing them also a spot to the Second phase of qualification for the European Men's Handball Championship 2020. Kosovo were drawn in Group 1 against Germany, Poland and Israel. The Dardanians were able to get some fair results after beating Israel at home 27-24 their first win in such a stage. They also secure an unlucky last second draw against Poland. Despite not qualifying to the main event Kosovo were able to actually compete with the 32 best European national teams in Handball.

At the 2021 World Men's Handball Championship – European qualification tournament, Kosovo drew with Italy 26-26 and defeated Georgia 30–21 to take the second place, behind Romania, in the qualifying group,but weren't able to progress to the second phase of qualifying.

Achievements in Handball

Volleyball
Volleyball first appeared in Kosovo in 1936 in the high schools of cities like Prishtinë, Pejë, and Prizren. The first championship was held in Pristina from 24 to 26 October 1948, with six teams participating: Proleteri, Buduçnosti, Trepça, Borac, Metohia, and Brastvo. During 1966–1967, four teams from Kosovo took part in the second division of the league of former Yugoslavia. In 1990 KV Prishtina-Elektroekonomia took part in qualification to enter the first division of the former Yugoslavia but did not succeed. The first League of Women was organized in 1975. Universiteti from Prishtina was the first team of women who took part in the second division league of Yugoslavia. Today the volleyball federation of Kosovo organizes competitions in the category of women and men. Major league called Superleague of Kosovo then come cup of Kosovo, the first league and junior's league.
Also part of the Volleyball Federation of Kosovo are competitions : Cup of Kosovo and beach volley.
Teams participating in Super league of Kosovo are: Theranda, KV Drenica, KV R&Rukolli, KV Besa, KV Luboteni, KV Ferizaji. The current champion is KV Luboteni.

Athletics
Athletics is a sport that includes running, walking, jumping, and throwing and is evidenced since the Illyrian period. The Athletics Federation of Kosovo is an association of athletes and their clubs that organize sports competitions in the discipline of athletics in Kosovo. The Athletics Federation of Kosovo was founded on 25 September 1991 in Prishtine. Some of the main responsibilities of the federation are to promote athletics in Kosovo, lead the development of athletics, coordinate the progress of the quality of athletics, and to adapt and implement short and long curriculum development in athletics. This association would not be so successful without the important achievements of their respective clubs. There are 13 active clubs, but the most successful ones are Atberia, Besa, Juniku, Llapi, Prishtina, Prizreni, and Trepca. From 25 clubs there are 196 males registered and 125 females registered, comprising a total of 330 active athletics in Kosovo. Currently, the association is preparing for the half marathon in Prishtina, one of the most important events that will be held on 11 May 2014.

Kosovo would make their debut in Athletics at the 2019 European Youth Summer Olympic Festival held in Baku. In which Muhamet Ramadani would win Gold in Shot put. Kosovo's first ever athletic medal in their history. Kosovo ranked 26th in the end. Recently Kosovo participated in the 2021 European Athletics U20 Championships held in Tallinn. In which they would win one gold medal in Shot put, at the end Kosovo ranked 15th.

Chess
Chess is a very common sport in Kosovo. Most chess events are organized by the Kosovo Chess Federation. Kosovan chess clubs are divided by the federation into two categories.

Tennis
Tennis in Kosovo is governed by the Federation of Tennis in Kosovo. Kosovo Tennis Federation, founded in 1992, has 300 active players belonging to different age groups. KT Prishtina was founded on the 27 June 1992 and is the oldest club in Kosovo. It has many players who are ranked highly in the Kosovo rankings list and it has its own tennis school and many coaches. The club consists of 230 members, 55% of which are females. KT Trepca was founded on 15 July 2003 and has its own tennis school which consists of 47 students. The main objective of the association is to group the teams and organized games between the clubs. Presently, there are ten clubs such as KT Prishtina, KT DielliX, KT Trepca, and KT Rahoveci. The federation is officially accepted in the International Tennis Federations (ITF) as the players from Kosovo are permitted to play in international games under the banner of ITF. This is a significant step toward the internationalization of tennis. The most famous tournaments with the highest participation are Sporek Open, Dielli Open, Trepca Open, Drenica Open, Prishtina Open and Masters.

Kosovo became the 50th member of Tennis Europe on 28 March 2015. which became effective in 2016. They made their debut at this sport when they participate at the 2016 Davis Cup in the Europe Zone Group D III. 
 
The female tennis player representing Kosovo at the Billie Jean King Cup since 2016. Their main success came at the 2019 Fed Cup in the Europe/Africa Zone Group III – Pool B where they finished second in the standings. Winning against North Macedonia with 1-2 and against Algeria with the same result. They faced Lithuania in the Play-offs where they lost with 0–2 to finish their campaign in 4th place.
 
The most successful tennis player from Kosovo is Adrijana Lekaj who won so far two singles and eight doubles titels in the ITF Circuit. Other known players are Donika Bashota who won two doubles titels in 2013  and Arlinda Rushiti who achieved the most wins for Kosovo at the Billie Jean King Cup with 13–13 in to

Rugby
The governing body for rugby union in Kosovo is the Kosovo Rugby Federation which was founded in 2018 and became a member of Rugby Europe on 3 December 2021. The Kosovo national rugby sevens team made its debut in an international rugby event at the Men's Sevens Conference 2 tournament on 11 June 2022 in Malta.

R.K Qikat is Kosovos first all-female rugby sevens team. They have entered regional competitions since 2017, and have a youth program for children under 12, in cooperation with the men's team. They have contributed to the path towards recognition of Kosovo Rugby Association by the World Rugby Organization and IOC.

Disality sports 
The Paralympic Committee of Kosovo gained provisional membership of the International Paralympic Committee in July 2022 and a team representing Kosovo is expected to make its debut at the Paralympic Games in 2024.

Special Olympics Kosovo was founded in 2002. Athletes from Kosovo first took part in the 2003 Special Olympics World Summer Games held in Dublin. This was the first time a team represented Kosovo at an international multisport event. Kosovo has participated in every Special Olympics World Summer Games since 2003 and Special Olympics World Winter Games since 2013.

Traditional sports

Albaniada is an event that is aimed at being traditional; it gathers together both young and old from all Albanian territories to play traditional games and sports. The main goal of this event is to 'bring back to life' games and sports that have been traditionally played in Albania.
Some of the traditional sports are hats, measure and stick, crouch, ball-on-horse, arm wrestling, bag hopping, leg wrestling, boards, capture the handkerchief, rope pull, stone throwing sideways, overhead stone throwing, single-hand stone throwing and swords. These kinds of sports can be played in an indoor environment like Oda or outside.

Sports fan clubs 
Kosovan people are known for the support they show for their local teams. There are four big fan clubs: Plisat, supporting Pristina; Shqiponjat, supporting Peja; Intelektualët, supporting FC Drita; and Skifterat, supporting SC Gjilani.

Plisat 

This fan club was founded in 1987 by the supporters of FC Prishtina. They got their name from the traditional Albanian cap called Plis. Usually, the members of Plisat stay in the east stand of the Pristina City Stadium while supporting their team in football. They are popularly known as "the 12th player" of FC Prishtina because of the massive support they provide during the games – no matter if losing or winning. In the early 1980s they made notable travels to Čačak, but particularly notable was when, in 1983, more than 7000 supporters followed FC Prishtina to the Marakana stadium in Belgrade in the club's historical victory over Red Star Belgrade in the at-the-time strong Yugoslav First League.

Besides supporting the football team, after the Kosovo war, Plisat started to also support their basketball team, Sigal Prishtina, and handball teams. They started to shape their 'support style' by cheering for their teams in different ways – followed by different choreography in the stands of the city stadium in Pristina. Plisat these days are the most famous fan club in Kosovo.

Shqiponjat

Shqiponjat (English:The Eagles) fan club was founded on December 13, 1993, in Peja. This fan club got their name from the symbol of the Albanian mountains – the Albanian Eagle. They support the Peć teams like KF Besa in football, KB Peja in basketball and KH Besa in handball.

Intelektualët

This fan club got this name (English:The Intellectuals) after the club was founded in 1947 by the intellectuals and the society of the city in Gjilan. They support all of the ten clubs that share the name Drita. This fan club mostly supports the biggest club of Gjilan – the football club Drita in the matches organized in the City Stadium of Gjilan, but the Intellectuals also cheer for the teams in basketball, volleyball and handball for both genres. The colors that characterize this fan club are white and blue, as those are the colors all clubs named Drita use.

There are several theories about the origin of the name of the fan club. One is that the name came from the good behavior of the fans, and the good organization of their matches in comparison with other clubs at that time in Kosovo. Another theory is that the name came from the patriotic factions within the club which used the club and its infrastructure as camouflage to organise clandestine meetings with other patriots of the Kosovo Albanian patriotic movement. Initially, the fan club was spontaneous and had no name, but after 1998, they became well-organized, with several well-identified subgroups which helped the team and the club in their different activities. The most powerful of these subgroups in the period around 2000 to 2002 were "Holy Blue" and "White and Blue Hooligans".

Nowadays, Intelektualët are the biggest and most active tifo groups after the war.

Arpagjik't

The fan clubs in Prizren started when the local football club, KF Liria, played in the Yugoslav Second League. People from the city organized with traditional songs, costumes and traditional dances, and headed to the local stadium now called  to support their football club at that time.

After the war in Kosovo, their presence in the matches became regular, and the fans started to call themselves Arpagjik't. After the first season, the groups Arpagjik't and The Panthers merged under one same name – Arpagjik't.

The first flag for the Panthers was prepared in 2001, measuring 20 by 7 meters, on which was written "Go Bashkimi, Go Panthers". The first days under the name Arpagjik't were very successful because the fan club distributed over 400 fan membership cards, with which the fans could watch the matches without paying anything. This was a new era for the ultras in Prizren under one name. The aim of the fan club is to prepare the city stadium and local indoor arenas in which the local clubs play games, prepare the stands with requisites, flags and club scarfs.

Skifterat
Skifterat, in English 'Falcons', was founded in September 1999 in the city of Gjilan.

Their colours are red and white and they support SC Gjilani. The name Skifterat ('Falcons') is a tribute to a battalion of soldiers within the KLA, where most of the soldiers were from the city of Gjilan.

The fan club is located in the city of Gjilan and it supports the football team SC Gjilani. They supported SC Gjilani many years before the war, but did not have a name prior to September 1999. They formed a group which they named Skifterat in the first football season after the war in Kosovo.

Skifterat take pride in being the most unique fan base in Kosovo. Most of the other fan clubs have teams from other sports to support which associate with their team's name. Skifterat only has one team, SC Gjilani, which does not have any other sports associated with their name.

Skifterat take pride in supporting a club which has not had any success lately and still they have always been there being their 12th player through rough times.

Skifterat were very active in the early days, being one of the first organized fan bases in Kosovo and bringing new things to the tifo scene in Kosovo.

Skifterat are one of the most organized fans in Kosovo, supporting their team home and away.

Sports venues
Source:

International sports membership

For a long time in Kosovo the people have missed international activities, so it has been a vacuum about organizing international sports events and the opportunity to represent the quality of the young athletes of Kosovo in the international level, who would give a positive impact in advancing in the local sport. Kosovo was a part of several international sports federations in the 1990s and has applied to become a member of many more after its 17 February 2008 unilateral declaration of independence from Serbia. Currently Kosovo federations are full members of seven international federations, provisional members of four international federations, associated members of two international federations and members of one European federation. On 22 October 2014 the International Olympic Committee announced that it had granted provisional recognition to the Kosovo Olympic Committee and proposed that it be granted full recognition at the IOC Session to be held in December 2014. On 8 December 2014, Olympic Committee of Kosovo became a full member of International Olympic Committee. The acceptance of Kosovo in the International Olympic Committee can have a significant positive impact in accepting other sport federations in the international level.

Accepted membership applications
The following sports federations have either admitted or have received the application from Republic of Kosovo to be admitted into their membership.

Medal winners in the Olympics, European Games and Mediterranean Games

Kosovar sportspeople

Yugoslavia/ Serbia and Montenegro

Other countries

See also

 Kosovo at the Olympics
 Kosovo at the European Games
 Kosovo national football team
 Football Superleague of Kosovo
 Kosovo national basketball team

Annotations

References

External links
 Olympic Committee of Kosovo
 The Ministry of Culture, Youth and Sports